Haaz Sleiman (born July 1, 1976) is a Lebanese actor. He most notably played the role of Tarek in the 2007 film The Visitor for which he was nominated for the Independent Spirit Award for Best Supporting Male and the role of Jesus in the American TV mini-series Killing Jesus, in addition to a number of American TV series.

Early life
Sleiman was born in the United Arab Emirates (UAE) and raised in Beirut, Lebanon. He immigrated to the United States when he was twenty-one years old.

Career
In 2006, Sleiman portrayed an American soldier in Iraq on the NBC series ER and, that same year, had a recurring role as an Arab billionaire in the CBS series Company Town.  He portrayed the terrorist suspect Heydar in three 2007 episodes of the FOX series 24 and appeared on both NCIS and Veronica Mars in 2007.

He co-starred as Tarek, an undocumented Syrian immigrant in the critically acclaimed 2007 independent film The Visitor, a drama directed by Tom McCarthy. The film was nominated for a Screen Actors Guild Award and an Academy Award. Sleiman also had small roles in the 2006 film American Dreamz and the 2007 film AmericanEast.

Sleiman played nurse Mohammed "Mo-Mo" De La Cruz in the first season of the Showtime dark comedy series Nurse Jackie, which premiered in June 2009.

In 2011, Sleiman played the role of Omar, a Palestinian activist, in the Channel 4 mini-series The Promise.

Sleiman also played the role of Kasim Tariq in the CW Network TV show Nikita; he appeared in two episodes.

Sleiman played Dr Rabia, a Syrian doctor in Channel 4's The State.

In 2013, Sleiman started as the titular character in the short lived Off-Broadway musical Venice.

Personal life 
In an interview with the Christian Broadcasting Network, Sleiman claimed that he is Muslim, Christian, and Jewish. On August 22, 2017, he came out as gay via a Facebook video.

Awards and nominations
Won 2nd place during the Boston Society of Film Critics Awards for "Best Ensemble Cast" for The Visitor
Nominated for Best Supporting Actor during Independent Spirit Awards for role in The Visitor
Nominated for Best Ensemble Cast for The Visitor during the Gotham Awards

Filmography

Film

Television

Video game

References

External links 
 

1976 births
21st-century Lebanese male actors
Gay actors
Lebanese male film actors
Lebanese male television actors
Lebanese Muslims
Gay Muslims
Lebanese LGBT people
Lebanese emigrants to the United States
Living people